Estremadura may refer to:

Estremadura Province (historical), Portugal
Estremadura Province (1936–1976), Portugal
 Lisboa VR, a Portuguese wine region called Estremadura until 2009

See also
Extremadura, an autonomous community of western Spain
Extremadura (disambiguation)
Extremaduran (disambiguation)